Girlfriend is the third studio album by American alternative rock musician Matthew Sweet. It was released on Zoo Entertainment in 1991.

The album was ranked at number 61 on Paste magazine's list of "The 90 Best Albums of the 1990s".

Recording
Sweet recorded Girlfriend in 1990, following his divorce. He later said to Rolling Stone, "It's funny how the album ended up showing everything I needed to feel. Everything I needed as an antidote is there." He told Entertainment Weekly, "People say, 'This is your big breakup record – will you still be able to write good songs?' I'm sure I'll be just as depressed at some other point in my life."

The album includes guitar contributions from Richard Lloyd, formerly of the band Television, and Robert Quine. Michael Azerrad of Rolling Stone wrote of the sound: "Equal parts anguish and elation, the heavily autobiographical Girlfriend plays Sweet's impeccable pop sense of noisy, passionate guitar work, recalling the Beatles' Revolver, early Neil Young and Television."

The album's production style was very stripped down and sparse, with wide pans and no reverb used on any tracks. On some tracks, notably "Divine Intervention," the drums were highly compressed and panned completely to one side of the stereo spectrum, in a move reminiscent of George Martin and the Beatles. The individual musicians' tracks were recorded whole in a few takes, with the notable exception of Quine's lead parts, which were pieced together from multiple takes. According to album engineer Jim Rondinelli, "Bob would get something going in the first couple of takes, and then he’d get really down on himself and go through this incredible self-loathing. On the fourth or fifth take, all this additional fire and anger would come out, and he’d take it out on his instrument. Then he’d be emotionally and physically exhausted."

Overview
The cover of the album features a photograph of actress Tuesday Weld from the late 1950s.  Originally called Nothing Lasts, the album was re-titled following objections to the title from Weld.

The music video for the title track (which aired on heavy rotation on MTV, MuchMusic and Night Tracks) featured clips from the anime film Space Adventure Cobra: The Movie, mainly featuring the character Jane Royal. The video for another one of the album's singles, "I've Been Waiting", used clips of the Urusei Yatsura character Lum.

The tracks "Evangeline" and "Your Sweet Voice" were both followed by the sound of a vinyl outgroove and a phonograph needle lifting off a record, which was meant to signify the end of each side of the album as though it were an LP (thus making the final three songs on the album to be, conceptually, considered bonus tracks). The song "Winona" was named after actress Winona Ryder, while "Evangeline" is sung from the point of view of Johnny Six from the comic book Evangeline.

Release

Released in October 1991, Girlfriend is Sweet's most commercially and critically successful album to date, with The A.V. Club labeling it the best power pop album of the 1990s. The album peaked at #100 on the Billboard 200 album chart. The Village Voice, on their Pazz & Jop critics' poll, listed Girlfriend as the #7 best album of 1991. The title track hit #4 on the Billboard Modern Rock Tracks chart and #10 on the Billboard Mainstream Rock chart. "Divine Intervention" hit #23 on the Modern Rock chart.

In 2006, the album was remastered and released under the "Legacy Edition" label, with three bonus tracks (originally released on the "Girlfriend" single, subtitled "the superdeformed CD", and also available on the Japanese version of the album), plus a second disc of home demos, live versions and session recordings called Goodfriend. Subtitled "Another Take on 'Girlfriend'", Goodfriend was a promotional CD partly distributed through Sweet's fan club, and was not commercially released until the Legacy Edition. "Goodfriend" was the original name of the title track, but after early listeners universally misheard the lyric, Sweet changed the title to "Girlfriend".
 
In 2014, the album received a vinyl release on the Plain Recordings label. (This was not the first release in LP format, however. Classic Records' "Rock the House" label issued it on vinyl, as did BMG in the US in the 1990s.) The single 12-inch vinyl disc featured the first 12 songs, with six songs on each side.  The vinyl sound effects were not added like they were on the CD.

Reissue 
In 2018, independent vinyl reissue label Intervention Records announced that it would be releasing Artist-Approved 2 LP Expanded Editions of 100% Fun, Altered Beast, and Girlfriend; the three albums will also be released on CD/SACD. Intervention also announced a first time on vinyl reissue of Son of Altered Beast.

Theatrical production
A theatrical production entitled Girlfriend, inspired by Sweet's album, debuted in 2010 at the Berkeley Repertory Theatre in Berkeley, California. The play was written by Todd Almond with songs from the album Girlfriend as well as subsequent Matthew Sweet albums.

Track listing

Track listing for Goodfriend

Personnel
Matthew Sweet – vocals, guitar, bass, piano

Additional personnel

Lloyd Cole – guitar
Robert Quine – guitar
Richard Lloyd – guitar
Ivan Julian – guitar
Greg Leisz – pedal steel guitar
Fred Maher – drums, guitar
Ric Menck – drums

Ron Pangborn – drums
Amy Ray – guitar, vocals
Emily Saliers – acoustic guitar
Jane Scarpantoni – cello
Paul Chastain – bass, vocals
Andy McCulla – guitar
Jim Rondinelli - recording engineer, mixing engineer

Charts

References

Matthew Sweet albums
1991 albums
Zoo Entertainment (record label) albums
Albums produced by Matthew Sweet
Albums produced by Fred Maher